Shelly Kagan (born 1956) is Clark Professor of Philosophy at Yale University, where he has taught since 1995. He is best known for his writings about moral philosophy and normative ethics. In 2007, Kagan's course about death was offered for free online, and was very popular. This led to him publishing a book on the subject in 2012. Kagan was elected to the American Academy of Arts and Sciences in 2016.

Education and career
A native of Skokie, Illinois, Kagan received his B.A. from Wesleyan University in 1976 and his Ph.D. from Princeton University in 1982. He taught at the University of Pittsburgh from 1981 until 1986, and at the University of Illinois at Chicago from 1986 until 1995, before taking a position at Yale.

Philosophical work

In his 1984 book Reasons and Persons, Derek Parfit credited Kagan as the "person from whom I have learnt the most", noting that Kagan's comments on his draft were half the length of the draft itself.

In 1989, Kagan's first book, The Limits of Morality, was published. It is an extended critique of two key assumptions underlying what Kagan calls "ordinary morality": the "common‐sense moral view that most of us accept". Specifically, the book questions the assumption that morality rules out certain actions (such as harming innocent people) even in situations where doing so might create greater good, and the assumption that we are "not required to make our greatest possible contribution to the overall good". According to Kagan, these two assumptions are indefensible, despite their widespread appeal.

In 1997, Kagan published a textbook, Normative Ethics, designed to provide a thorough introduction to the subject for upper-level undergraduate or graduate students. In 2007, his Yale course "Death" was recorded for Open Yale Courses, and his book Death is based on these lectures. In 2010, Yale University reported that Kagan's "Death" course had made him one of the most popular foreign teachers in China.

Kagan also explored desert, the concept of what people deserve, in his 2012 book The Geometry of Desert. According to Kagan, people differ in terms of how morally deserving they are and it is good for people to get what they deserve. The book attempts to reveal the hidden complexity of moral desert.

Kagan has served as a member of the editorial board of the journal Ethics. In 2016, he was made a fellow of the American Academy of Arts and Sciences.

Debate with William Lane Craig 
Kagan debated the topic "Is God necessary for Morality" with analytic philosopher, theologian and Christian apologist William Lane Craig at Columbia University.

Randal Rauser, a Canadian Baptist theologian and professor of historical theology, rated this debate Craig's worst performance, saying, "it wasn’t simply because Kagan was himself a surprisingly good debater with an undeniably charming folksy incredulity. It was that Craig’s arguments were shown to be mere emotive talking points based on highly dubious premises".

Richard Carrier, an author and activist whose works focus on the historicity of Jesus, atheism and empiricism, cited this debate as one of Craig's two biggest losses, along with one with physicist Sean M. Carroll.

After the debate, Craig wrote, "the view Kagan defended in the debate was not his [Kagan's] view at all". Instead, Craig wrote, Kagan is a radical consequentialist. Craig also wrote:I did respond briefly to Prof. Kagan's view, Alexander, but I didn't press the point because our hosts with the Veritas Forum had made it very clear to me that they were not interested in having a knock-down debate but a friendly dialogue that would foster a warm and inviting atmosphere for non-believing students at Columbia. The goal was simply to get the issues out on the table in a congenial, welcoming environment, which I think we did.

Bibliography
 The Limits of Morality, Oxford University Press, 1989. .
 Normative Ethics, Westview Press, 1997. .
 Death, Yale University Press, 2012. .
 The Geometry of Desert, Oxford University Press, August 2012. .
 How to Count Animals, more or less, Oxford University Press, April 2019. .

See also
American philosophy
List of American philosophers

References

External links

Kagan's personal website

American philosophers
Consequentialists
Utilitarians
Wesleyan University alumni
Princeton University alumni
Yale University faculty
20th-century American Jews
Jewish philosophers
Living people
Place of birth missing (living people)
1963 births
21st-century American Jews